USS New England (AD-32), was a planned destroyer tender of the United States Navy during World War II.

Originally planned as a submarine tender and designated AS-28, New England was reclassified as a destroyer tender and redesignated AD-32 on 14 August 1944; she was named New England on 2 September 1944. The New England-class was to be a modified Dixie class destroyer tender.

New England was laid down on 1 October 1944 by the Tampa Shipbuilding Company, Inc., at Tampa, Florida. She was scheduled to be launched on 1 April 1946 with Mrs. Paul H. Bastedo as her sponsor, but the ships construction was cancelled on 12 August 1945 when she was 12% complete, due to the end of World War II.

References

Bibliography

External links

 Dictionary of American Naval Fighting Ships (DANFS): New England (AD-32)

 

Proposed ships of the United States Navy
Ships built in Tampa, Florida
Cancelled ships of the United States Navy
Shenandoah-class destroyer tenders